Whitfield  may refer to:

Places

Australia
 Whitfield, Queensland, a suburb of Cairns
 Whitfield, Victoria, an agricultural township

England
 Whitfield, Derbyshire, a hamlet and former parish
 Whitfield, Gloucestershire, a hamlet
 Whitfield, Herefordshire
 Whitfield, Kent, a village, civil parish and electoral ward
 Whitfield, Northamptonshire, a village and parish
 Whitfield, Northumberland, a village and former civil parish

Ireland
 Whitfield, Waterford

Scotland
 Whitfield, Dundee, a residential, social-housing scheme located to the north of Dundee, Scotland

United States	
 Whitfield, Manatee County, Florida, an unincorporated community and census-designated place
 Whitfield, Santa Rosa County, Florida, an unincorporated community and census-designated place
 Whitfield, Indiana, an unincorporated community
 Whitfield, Kansas, a ghost town
 Whitfield, Kentucky, an unincorporated community
 Whitfield, Jones County, Mississippi, an unincorporated community
 Whitfield, Rankin County, Mississippi, an unincorporated community
 Whitfield, Pennsylvania, a census-designated place
 Whitfield, Tennessee, an unincorporated community
 Whitfield, Virginia, an unincorporated community
 Whitfield County, Georgia

People
 Whitfield (surname), including a list of people
 Whitfield (given name), a list of people
 Whitfield family, a Norman family of landowners in Northumberland, England
 Whitfield family of the United States, an American South political family, a cadet branch of the Whitfield family

Schools
 Whitfield School, Creve Coeur, Missouri, a private prep school
 Whitfield High School, original name of Braeview Academy, Dundee, Scotland

Transportation
 Whitfield Street, London Borough of Camden
 Whitfield railway line, a former railway in Victoria, Australia
 Whitfield railway station, the terminus railway station for the Whitfield railway line

Other uses
 The Whitfield Prize, awarded annually by the Royal Historical Society
 Whitfield Records, a record label
 Whitfield Barracks, Hong Kong, a former barracks

See also
 
 Whitfield v. United States, a United States Supreme Court case
 R. v. Whitfield, a Supreme Court of Canada case
 Whitefield (disambiguation)
 Whitfeld